Van Erp is a Dutch toponymic surname meaning "from/of Erp". People with this name include:

Bas van Erp (1979–2016), Dutch wheelchair tennis player
Dirk van Erp (1860–1933), Dutch-born American artisan, coppersmith and metalsmith
Henrica van Erp (c.1480–1548), Dutch abbess and historian
Maran van Erp (born 1990), Dutch football defender
Pepijn van Erp (born 1972), Dutch mathematician and skeptical activist
 (1874–1958), Dutch army engineer and conservation architect of Borobudur
 (1824–1905), Dutch Navy officer; Minister of Defence from 1874 to 1885

References

Dutch-language surnames
Toponymic surnames